FK Radnički is a football club from Berane, Montenegro. The club was founded in 2012.

History
Football club Radnički was founded at 2012  as a third team in the city, after FK Berane and FK Napredak. After only two seasons, FK Radnički won the trophy in the Third League - North, and after the playoffs against FK Iskra and OFK Federal, they gained historical promotion to the 2014–15 Montenegrin Second League.
FK Radnički spent three consecutive seasons in the Montenegrin Second League and played overall 93 games. In the 2016-17 season, due to lack of finances, the team finished at the bottom of the table, with relegation to the Third League.

Honours and achievements
 Montenegrin Third League – 1
winners (1): 2013-14

Current squad

Stadium

FK Radnički plays their home games on Berane City Stadium. It's the largest stadium in Northern Montenegro, with a capacity of 8,000 seats. Last renovation was finished in 2018, when stadium got the modern stand with seats, roofs, dressing rooms and offices under the UEFA standards.

See also 
 Berane

References 

 
Association football clubs established in 2012
Football clubs in Montenegro
2012 establishments in Montenegro
Berane